Utik is a village in the Municipality of Vodice in the Upper Carniola region of Slovenia.

Church

The local church is dedicated to Saint Stephen and was first mentioned in documents dating to 1526.

References

External links

Utik on Geopedia

Populated places in the Municipality of Vodice